Villamediana is a municipality located in the province of Palencia, Castile and León, Spain. According to the 2004 census (INE), the municipality had a population of 229 inhabitants.

In Spanish history a prominent role was played by Juan de Tassis, 1st Count of Villamediana and his son Juan de Tassis, 2nd Count of Villamediana.

References

Municipalities in the Province of Palencia